Kalakpa Game Production Reserve is a 32,020 hectare forest reserve in Ghana.

Location 
The reserve is located in the southeastern part of the Country, about 120 kilometers northeast of the capital Accra and about 30 kilometers south from the Volta Regional capital, Ho.

Description  
The protected area was founded in 1975 by the Ghanaian government, located on the foothills of the Togo Mountains in the Ho Municipal Area. Before this area became an animal reserve, it served mainly as preferred hunting area for expatriates in Ghana.

In this animal reserve you can find, apart from lions and elephants. Among other animals there is a variety of buffaloes, antelopes, baboons and smaller mammals in the reserve. The bird world is worth seeing here. The reserve also boasts many butterfly species.

Threats 

 In 2009, there were reports of encroachments on the Kalakpa Resource Reserve.
 Also in 2016 there were reports of  illegal logging at the Kalakpa Resource Reserve in the Volta Region, with the risks of the Reserve losing most of its trees.
In 2018 the Regional Minister said force would have to be considered to relocate the encroachers.  About 28 communities with a population of about 2,000, from the four districts hosting the reserve; Adaklu, Ho West, North, and Central Tongu, who were inhabiting the Reserve illegally.

References 

Protected areas established in 1975
Protected areas of Ghana
Forest reserves of Ghana
1975 establishments in Ghana